Read Street is a main road and suburban distributor in Rockingham south of Perth, and runs through or alongside the suburbs of Rockingham, Cooloongup, Safety Bay and Waikiki, linking them to the Rockingham Shopping Centre. It ends in a roundabout at Safety Bay Road and becomes Warnbro Sound Avenue at that point. It is a dual carriageway for all of its length.

Major intersections

Read Street has the following major intersections:
 Patterson Road
 Council Avenue (at Rockingham City Shopping Centre)
 Rae Road
 Willmott Drive
 Malibu Road
 Gnangara Drive
 Safety Bay Road east & west / Warnbro Sound Avenue south

See also

References

Roads in Perth, Western Australia
City of Rockingham